A Cadet corps, historically an admissions-based all-boys military cadets school, prepared boys to become commissioned officers in Imperial Russia. Boys entered a cadet corps between the ages of 8 and 15.

History
Empress Anna Ivanovna founded the first cadet corps in Saint Petersburg, Russian Empire, in 1731. The term of education was seven years. All instructors had a military rank; they taught a full program of military preparation. In 1766 Catherine the Great's educational reforms broadened the curriculum to include the sciences, philosophy, ethics, history, and international law.

A graduate from the corps became a junker and had prime candidacy for a military career.

During the October Revolution and the 1917-1923 Russian Civil War, cadets and junkers largely supported the anti-bolshevik White movement. (Distinguish the military cadets of this era from the members of the Constitutional Democratic Party, known from its initials (KD) as Kadets. The Constitutional Democratic Party also opposed Bolshevism.) A small portion of cadets succeeded in  evacuating with the White Army towards the end of Russian Civil War to western countries.

Many cadets who escaped alive formed cadet corps in other countries, most notably at Bela Crkva in the Kingdom of Yugoslavia, where they received the patronage of King Alexander I of Yugoslavia (reigned 1921–1934) - himself a former pupil in the Saint Petersburg Page Corps.

During World War II a number of White émigré ex-cadets joined the Axis-sponsored Russian Corps (founded in 1941) in Yugoslavia and the Guard of the general A.A.Vlasow (ROA), seeing it as a means of continuing the battle against the Bolshevik régime.

After World War II ended in 1945, with the emigration of cadets to the United States, Canada, Argentina, and Australia, White émigré cadet corps ceased to function. A cadet union was formed to unite the graduates of the cadet corps.

Modern era

After the fall of the USSR in 1991, cadet corps were re-established in Russia by veterans of the armed forces and descendants of cadet corps graduates. These now educate both boys and girls, with several units named after Soviet Great Patriotic War heroes as well as after Russian military heroes through the centuries. These Cadet Corps and Cadet Schools, found in various Russian cities, aim towards preparing children for service not just in the Russian Armed Forces but also in the Ministry of Internal Affairs, the National Guard of Russia, the Ministry of Emergency Situations, the Investigative Committee of Russia and the Federal Security Service (FSB). One cadet corps prepares teens for service in the Ministry of Justice; the Moscow Diplomatic Cadet Corps educates those inclined towards future careers in the diplomatic services of the Ministry of Foreign Affairs. Traditionally, the Ground Forces-affiliated cadets use the regular army field uniform, but with the own sleeve insignias and the letters "KK" on the shoulder boards, but dress uniforms differ. There are also Cossack cadet corps in existence as well.

Cadets educational establishments in the USSR and Russia

Mainstream corps
Suvorov Military School
Nakhimov Naval School
Ministry of Defense of Russia Girls Boarding School
Kronstadt Sea Cadet Corps
Moscow National Guard Presidential Cadets School
Moscow National Pensions School Cadet Corps
Moscow Cadet Corps of the Investigative Committee of Russia

Cossack corps 

 Astrakhan Cossack Cadet Corps
 Shakhty Cossack Cadet Corps
 Aksanskiy Cossack Cadet Corps
 Aksai Cossack Cadet Corps
 Novorossiysk Cossack cadet corps
 Crimean Cossack Cadet Corps
 Kuban Cossack Cadet Corps 
 Yeysk Cossack Cadet Corps

Other corps
Saint Petersburg Rocket Artillery Cadet Corps
St. Petersburg Cadet Corps
Krasnoyarsk Cadet Corps
Governor's Cadet Boarding School of the Ministry of Emergencies, Kemerovo
Siberian Aviation Cadet Corps named after Alexander Pokryshkin Novosibirsk
Achinsk Cadet Corps, Krasnoyarsk Territory
Mountain Cadet Corps
Ulan-Ude Cadet Corps
First Moscow Cadet Corps
Military Space Peter the Great Cadet Corps, St. Petersburg
Military Technical Cadet Corps, Togliatti
 Pupils of Inmates
 Irkutsk Guards Cadet Corps of Strategic Missile Forces
 Voronezh Grand Duke Mikhail Pavlovich Cadet Corps
 Moscow Justice Cadet Corps
 Moscow Cadet Corps named after Marshal Zhukov
 Karelian Cadet Corps named after Alexander Nevsky
 Ufa Airborne Cadet Corps named after Musa Gareev
 Don Emperor Alexander III Cadet Corps, Novocherkassk
 Moscow Cadet Music Corps
 St. Petersburg Cadet Course of the Federal Protective Service

See also
 Page Corps (Russia)
 Sea Cadet Corps (Russia)
 Military education in the Soviet Union
 Military academies in Russia

References

Military schools in Russia
Russian military youth groups